Richard Kahn (1912-1987) was an American bridge player.

He died on May 24, 1987 of complications resulting from Parkinson's disease and heart problems at Lenox Hill Hospital. He was 75 years old and lived in Manhattan.

Bridge accomplishments

Wins

 North American Bridge Championships (6)
 Marcus Cup (1) 1953 
 Hilliard Mixed Pairs (1) 1934 
 Reisinger (1) 1949 
 Spingold (1) 1955 
 Vanderbilt (1) 1953 
 von Zedtwitz Life Master Pairs (1) 1951

Runners-up

 Bermuda Bowl (1) 1956 
 North American Bridge Championships (3)
 Open Pairs (1928-1962) (1) 1951 
 Spingold (1) 1963 
 Vanderbilt (1) 1958

Notes

American contract bridge players
Bermuda Bowl players
1912 births
1987 deaths